Qiwiña Q'asa (Quechua qiwiña, qillwa, qiwlla gull, q'asa mountain pass, "gull pass", also spelled Khihuiña Khasa) is a mountain in the Bolivian Andes which reaches a height of approximately . It is located in the Potosí Department, Antonio Quijarro Province, Porco Municipality, west of Porco.

References 

Mountains of Potosí Department